Richard Fantl (1903–1961) was an American film editor. He was under contract to the Hollywood studio Columbia Pictures for many years. He later worked in television.

Selected filmography
 Mariners of the Sky/Navy Born (1936)
 Westbound Mail (1937)
 Murder in Greenwich Village (1937)
 The Durango Kid (1940)
 Blazing Six Shooters (1940)
 Nobody's Children (1940)
 I Was a Prisoner on Devil's Island (1941)
 A Man's World (1942)
 Stand By All Networks (1942)
 Rough, Tough and Ready (1945)
Drifting Along  (1946)
 Galloping Thunder (1946)
 The Woman from Tangier (1948)
 Kazan (1949)
 When the Redskins Rode (1951)
 Al Jennings of Oklahoma (1951)
 Indian Uprising (1952)

References

Bibliography
 Wheeler W. Dixon. Lost in the Fifties: Recovering Phantom Hollywood. SIU Press, 2005.

External links

1903 births
1961 deaths
American film editors